Prorophora dialeuca is a species of snout moth described by George Hampson in 1912. It is found in Sri Lanka and India.

References

Phycitinae
Moths described in 1912